Sterling Township is a township in Rice County, Kansas, in the United States.

Sterling Township was established in 1871.

References

Townships in Rice County, Kansas
Townships in Kansas